Side Three is the fifteenth solo album by Adrian Belew, released in 2006.

The album features contributions from various other musicians including Tool's Danny Carey on drums, Primus' Les Claypool on bass guitar and a single guest appearance by Belew's King Crimson bandmate Robert Fripp.

Track listing
All songs written by Adrian Belew.
 "Troubles" – 3:14
 "Incompetence Indifference" – 5:02
 "Water Turns to Wine" – 3:47
 "Crunk" – 1:17
 "Drive" – 3:27
 "Cinemusic" – 1:37
 "Whatever" – 3:18
 "Men in Helicopters v4.0" – 3:07
 "Beat Box Car" – 4:30
 "Truth Is" – 1:34
 "The Red Bull Rides a Boomerang Across the Blue Constellation" – 4:34
 "&" – 3:18

Personnel

Musicians
 Adrian Belew – vocals, guitar, instrumentation
 Robert Fripp – flute guitar (track 3)
 Les Claypool – bass (tracks 7-8)
 Danny Carey – drums (tracks 7-8)
 Mel Collins – saxophone (track 9)
 The Prophet Omega – voice
 Martha Belew – telephone message

Technical
 Adrian Belew – producer, artwork
 Ken Latchney – engineer
 Andrew Mendelson – mastering
 Julie Rust – layout
 Mark Coleman – photography

References

Adrian Belew albums
2006 albums
Albums produced by Adrian Belew
Sanctuary Records albums